Sarah‑Jane Curran (born 1984) née Sarah‑Jane Coleman is a Northern Irish international lawn & indoor bowler.

Bowls career
In 2011, under her maiden name of Coleman she won the fours bronze medal at the Atlantic Bowls Championships.

The following year she was selected for a combined Ireland team at the 2012 World Outdoor Bowls Championship, where she competed in the triples event and fours event.

In 2016, she competed in her second World Outdoor Championship in the fours and pairs.

She became an Irish national champion in 2016 after winning the triples at the Irish National Bowls Championships.

Personal life
She is a Director of the County Antrim Indoor Bowling Club.

References

1984 births
Living people
Female lawn bowls players from Northern Ireland